Dulché Catalina Escalante  (29 June 1897 – 3 January 1950), better known as Catalina D'Erzel,  was a Mexican journalist, playwright, novelist and poet.

Biography

Early life
Escalante was born on 29 June 1897 in Silao, Guanajuato. According to various sources, she began her writing career at an early age; dramas such as Orphans and The plagiarist, were written at the age of 12. At the age of 18, she published her first story under her pseudonym D'Erzel in the El Nacional newspaper.

Career and legacy
The majority of D'Erzel's career was devoted to journalism. She collaborated in renowned newspapers and magazines such as El Universal, El Universal Ilustrado, El Hogar, El Demócrata, El Nacional, Revista de Revistas as well as the magazine Todo. Between 1932 and 1941, she published a column in the newspaper Excélsior called "Digo yo como mujer", that served as the opening that would "unmask the seudomoralistas talking about women." This section served to publish ideas on the perception of the women in journalism, especially from the perspective of writer Francisco Ibarra de Anda in his book.

In 1945, she received the Ordre des Palmes Académiques for the play Los hijos de Francia. She died on 3 January 1950. According to experts, "she represented the vanguard of a social theater. Of a theater that educated Awoke consciences about the political and economic social problems she faced daily." Although D'Erzel stated that Mexican society asked the woman not to think for herself, her works served as an instruction to the public of the problems that existed regarding the lack of activity of women in literature.

Sources

References

Bibliography
 
 

1897 births
1950 deaths
20th-century Mexican writers
20th-century Mexican women writers
People from Silao, Guanajuato
Mexican women journalists